Abryanz Style and Fashion Awards 2018 was held on 7 December 2018 and marked the sixth edition of the Abryanz Style and Fashion Awards (ASFAs).

The event, under the theme Fashion is Power, was hosted by Kenyan radio and television personalities Anita Nderu and Tracy Wanjiru, and featured fashion showcases from Nigeria's Mai Atafo, South Africa's David Tlale and Laduma Ngoxokolo, Uganda's Anita Beryl of Beryl Couture, Alex Alecool of Alecool Clothing and Kkoolo. Spice Diana, Lydia Jazmine and Lilian Mbabazi performed their music with Lilian paying a tribute to former spouse  the late Mowzey Radio.

Nominations started on August 27, 2018, and closed on 27 September. The list of nominees was then released at a cocktail party on 27 October 2018 held at the  Serena Hotel in Kampala and voting was opened in late November.

Nominees and Winners

See also 
 Abryanz Style and Fashion Awards (ASFAs)

References

External links 

 

Ugandan awards
Fashion awards
African awards
Annual events in Uganda
Fashion events in Africa